The Wild DoubleEnder is an American twin engine utility aircraft designed for bush flying and also to minimize risk from engine failure and subsequent adverse yaw.

Design and development
The DoubleEnder is a two place tandem seat conventional landing gear equipped, high winged aircraft. The two engines are mounted in tandem on top of the fuselage in a push-pull configuration. The steel tube fuselage is fabric covered with a plexiglas nose. A variety of wing configurations and lift devices were used during the development period.

Specifications (DoubleEnder)

References

External links
Video of Wild DoubleEnder departure performance - cockpit view
Video of Wild DoubleEnder departure performance - external view

Homebuilt aircraft
Twin-engined push-pull aircraft
High-wing aircraft
Aircraft first flown in 2010